
Lake Lauerz (German: Lauerzersee, old spelling: Lowerzer See) is a lake in the Canton of Schwyz, Switzerland.

Geography 

The lake's water area is divided between the municipalities of Lauerz, Schwyz and Steinen. There are two small islands in the lake, Schwanau and Roggenburg, both of which are in the municipality of Lauerz. The villages of Lauerz, on the southern side of the lake and in its eponymous municipality, and Seewen, at the eastern end of the lake in the municipality of Schwyz, lie on or close to the shore of the lake.

The lake's principal inflow is the Steiner Aa, which flows into the north shore of the lake having passed through the village of Steinen, along with a number of smaller streams.

This damaged the villages of Lauerz and Seewen and the island of Schwanau, and partly filled the lake. More recently, floods in 1999 and 2005 have affected lakeside properties, especially in Lauerz, and attempts have been made to control the water level by connecting Lake Lauerz through a tunnel to Lake Lucerne.

See also
List of lakes of Switzerland

References

External links

Waterlevels at Lauerz

Lakes of Switzerland
Lakes of the canton of Schwyz
LLauerz